

A
Bennie Aldridge,
Sisto Averno

B
Billy Baggett,

C
Joe Campanella,
Pat Cannamela,
Bob Celeri,
Don Colo,

D
Jerry Davis,
Art Donovan

E
Brad Ecklund,
Dan Edwards

F
Gene Felker,
Keith Flowers

G
Sonny Gandee,
Chubby Grigg

H
Dick Hoerner,
Weldon Humble

J
Ken Jackson,
Keever Jankovich

K
Tom Keane

L
Jim Lansford,
Hank Lauricella

M
Gino Marchetti,
Dick McKissack

O
Chuck Ortmann

P
Ray Pelfrey,
Johnny Petitbon,
Barney Poole,

R
Joe Reid,
George Robison

S
Will Sherman,
Joe Soboleski

T
Art Tait,
George Taliaferro,
Hamp Tanner,
Zollie Toth,
Frank Tripucka

V
Fritz Von Erich

W
Dick Wilkins,
Stan Williams,
John Wozniak

Y
Buddy Young

References

profootballreference|accessdate=2009-06-01

 
Dallas T